Ten Killers Came from Afar is a 1975 Italian-Spanish western film directed by  Juan Bosch, written by Renato Izzo, and starring Anthony Steffen, Claudio Undari, and Furio Meniconi.

Cast

References

External links
 

Spanish Western (genre) films
1975 Western (genre) films
1975 films
Films directed by Juan Bosch
Films produced by Alberto Grimaldi
Films scored by Marcello Giombini
Films with screenplays by Renato Izzo
Films shot in Barcelona
Films shot in Rome